A number of ships of the French Navy have borne the name Tonnant ("Thundering"). Among them:
 , a 76-gun ship of the line
 , a 90-gun ship of the line
 , an 80-gun ship of the line
  an 80-gun ship of the line, lead ship of her class
 , 
 , a  during the Second World War (1934–1942)
 , a  ballistic missile submarine (1977–1999)

French Navy ship names